Hipparchia neapolitana, the Italian grayling, is a butterfly of the family Nymphalidae. 
It is an endemic species found only in the Campania region of Italy.
neapolitana

References

External links 
Hipparchia (Parahipparchia) neapolitana (Stauder, 1921) at Fauna Europaea
van Swaay, C., Wynhoff, I., Verovnik, R., Wiemers, M., López Munguira, M., Maes, D., Sasic, M., Verstrael, T., Warren, M. & Settele, J. 2010. Hipparchia neapolitana. The IUCN Red List of Threatened Species 2010: e.T173206A6973854. online 

Hipparchia (butterfly)
Butterflies of Europe
Endemic fauna of Italy
Butterflies described in 1921